Ernst Hampel (18 August 1885 in Bodenstadt, Austria-Hungary – 23 January 1964 in Oberfellabrunn, Austria) was an Austrian teacher and politician. Hampel was a member of the Austrian Nationalrat from 10 November 1920 to 2 May 1934, from the Greater German People's Party. In the 1930s he joined the ranks of the Nazi Party's Sturmabteilung.

References

Austrian politicians
Austrian schoolteachers
1885 births
1964 deaths
People from Přerov District
Greater German People's Party politicians
Members of the National Council (Austria)
Sturmabteilung personnel
Moravian-German people
Austrian people of Moravian-German descent